Tallarico can refer to the following people:

Steven Tyler, American musician of Aerosmith (born Steven Victor Tallarico)
Mia Tyler, American model, actress, and daughter to Steven Tyler (born Mia Abagale Tallarico)
Tommy Tallarico, American video game composer
Tony Tallarico, American comic book artist

See also
Vincenzo Tallarico, Italian screenwriter and film actor
Picky Tallarico, film director and photographer
Guy Tallarico, an American Republican Party politician